The Sexy 4 Eva World Tour (stylized as the SEXY 4EVA World Tour) was the third headlining concert tour by Korean-American recording artist Jay Park. The tour was advertised as Park's first solo world tour. It began July 2019 in South Korea, playing over 30 shows in Asia, Europe, North America and Australasia.

Pop-up stores selling tour merchandise appeared in Seoul, Tokyo, London, and Seattle during their respective tour dates.

Background

Jay Park announced his world tour on social media on May 10, 2019 with two shows scheduled in Seoul, South Korea. On June 1, 2019, he announced the dates for the European leg of his tour. Early bird tickets for the North American leg of the tour went on sale on June 26, 2019. Other tickets went on sale on June 28, 2019. On August 25, 2019, tour dates in New Zealand and Australia were announced.

Ted Park performed during part of the North American leg of the tour.

Opening acts

Setlist
The following setlist was obtained from the concert held on September 6, 2019, at the Shrine Auditorium in Downtown Core, Singapore. It does not represent every concert for the duration of the tour. 

"Forget About Tomorrow"
"Me Like Yuh"
"Solo"
"Iffy"
"Joah"
"Drive"
"My Last"
"V"
"All I Wanna Do"
"Yacht"
"Feng Shui"
"Dank"
"사실은 (The Truth Is)"
"곁에 있어주길 (Stay With Me)"
"Abandoned"
"Know Your Name"
"Worldwide"
"Finish Line"
"On It"
"SOJU"
"K-TOWN"
"우리가 빠지면 Party가 아니지 (Ain't No Party Like an AOMG Party)"
"몸매 (Mommae)"
"Sexy 4 Eva"
"All Day (Flex)"
"Water"
"Giddy Up"
"니가 알던 내가 아냐 (Remix) [Who You (Remix)]"

Shows

References

2019 concert tours
2020 concert tours
Jay Park